Araucaria montana, the mountain araucaria, is a species of conifer in the family Araucariaceae. It is found only in New Caledonia.

Araucaria montana is the most widely distributed of New Caledonia's native Araucaria species, and is found throughout the main island of Grande Terre, as well as a small population on Île d'Art. However it is still considered vulnerable due to fragmentation of populations and degradation of habitat, due mainly to mining activities. Height of mature trees can vary from 10 to 40 meters. A population genetic study suggested that the less common A. laubenfelsii may not be distinct from A. montana.
The Latin specific epithet montana refers to mountains or coming from mountains.

References

montana
Endemic flora of New Caledonia
Taxonomy articles created by Polbot
Taxa named by Jean Antoine Arthur Gris
Taxa named by Adolphe-Théodore Brongniart